This is a complete listing of National Football League (NFL) playoff games, grouped by franchise. Games featuring relocated teams are kept with their ultimate relocation franchises. Bolded years indicate wins. "(Years in italics)" indicate a pending playoff game. Tables are sorted first by the number of games, then the number of wins, and then by season. Updated through the 2022–23 NFL playoffs.

Arizona Cardinals

Atlanta Falcons

Baltimore Ravens

Buffalo Bills

Carolina Panthers

Chicago Bears

Cincinnati Bengals

Cleveland Browns

Dallas Cowboys

Denver Broncos

Detroit Lions

Green Bay Packers

Houston Texans

Indianapolis Colts

Jacksonville Jaguars

Kansas City Chiefs

Las Vegas Raiders

Los Angeles Chargers

Los Angeles Rams

Miami Dolphins

Minnesota Vikings

New England Patriots

New Orleans Saints

New York Giants

New York Jets

Philadelphia Eagles

Pittsburgh Steelers

San Francisco 49ers

Seattle Seahawks

Tampa Bay Buccaneers

Tennessee Titans

Washington Commanders

Most frequent matchups

Notes

See also
List of MLB postseason series
List of NBA playoff series
List of NHL playoff series